The Newcastle-upon-Tyne North by-election of 21 March 1957 was held after the elevation to the Peerage of National Liberal and Conservative MP (MP) Gwilym Lloyd George.

The seat was safe, having been won by Lloyd George at the 1955 United Kingdom general election by nearly 11,000 votes

Result of the previous general election

Result of the by-election

References

1957 elections in the United Kingdom
1957 in England
20th century in Newcastle upon Tyne
By-election, 1957
By-elections to the Parliament of the United Kingdom in Northumberland constituencies